William Biddell (8 August 1825 – 25 October 1900) was a British Conservative Party politician.

He was elected to the House of Commons  at the 1880 general election as one of the two Members of Parliament (MPs) for the Western division of Suffolk, and held the seat until the constituency was abolished at the 1885 general election.

References

External links 
 

1825 births
1900 deaths
Conservative Party (UK) MPs for English constituencies
UK MPs 1880–1885